Bridget S. Wade is a British micropalaeontologist who is a professor at the University College London. Her research considers Cenozoic climate change, which she investigates by studying preserved planktonic foraminifera. Wade was a guest on the 2020 Royal Institution Christmas Lectures.

Early life and education 
Wade was an undergraduate student at the University of Leeds. She did an MSc in Micropalaeontology at UCL. She moved to the University of Edinburgh for her graduate studies where she studied stable isotope records as a means to understand Eocene climate change.

Research and career 
After earning her doctorate, Wade was awarded a Natural Environment Research Council (NERC) postdoctoral fellowship. Wade continued her scientific career in the United States, first at Rutgers University as a Lindemann Research Fellow and then as an Assistant and Associate Professor at Texas A&M University.

Wade has taken part in the Ocean Drilling Program, Integrated Ocean Drilling Program, International Continental Scientific Drilling Program and the Tanzania Drilling Project. This research resulted in Wade making contributions to the field of palaeontology, including identifying that before the extinction of Eocene planktonic foraminifera there was an increase in the production of surface water, which triggered the loss of algal photosymbionts. She created a high-resolution astrochronological framework to allow for the characterisation of fluctuations in ice volume (including their magnitude and frequency) and evaluation of their impact on the global carbon cycle.

In 2013 Wade joined University College London as a Professor of Micropalaeontology.

Awards and honours 
 2005 Elected Chair of the International Commission on Stratigraphy Paleogene Planktonic Foraminifera Working Group 
 2008 Palaeontological Association Hodson Award 
 2009 National Science Foundation CAREER Award
 2011 Micropalaeontological Society Alan Higgins Award 
 Elected Fellow of the Paleontology Society
 2012 The Geological Society Wollaston Fund
 2013 Paleontology Society Charles Schuchert Award
 2016 European Consortium for Ocean Research Drilling Distinguished Lecturer
 2020 Guest presenter on the Royal Institution Christmas Lectures

Selected publications

References 

Living people
Year of birth missing (living people)
Paleontologists
British women earth scientists
British climatologists
Alumni of the University of Leeds
Alumni of the University of Edinburgh
Texas A&M University faculty
Rutgers University people